The 1986 Asian Taekwondo Championships were the 7th edition of the Asian Taekwondo Championships, and were held in Darwin, Australia from 9 to 11 November, 1984.

Medal summary

Men

Women

Medal table

References

Results

External links
Results

Asian Championships
Asian Taekwondo Championships
Asian Taekwondo Championships
Taekwondo Championships
Sport in Darwin, Northern Territory
Taekwondo in Australia
1980s in the Northern Territory